Anil Bagchir Ekdin is a 2015 Bangladeshi film directed by Morshedul Islam. The film was based on Humayun Ahmed's novel of the same name. It won six awards, including the awards for Best Film and Best Director (both jointly with the film Bapjaner Bioscope) at the 40th Bangladesh National Film Awards.

Cast
 Aref Syed as Anil
 Jyotika Jyoti as Atoshi, sister of Anil
 Gazi Rakayet as Ayub Ali
 Toufiq Emon
 Farhana Mithu
 S M Mohsin

Guest Appearance
 Misha Sawdagor

Awards
2015 Bangladesh National Film Awards
 Best Film
 Best Director
 Best Actor in a Supporting Role
 Best Music Director
 Best Female Playback Singer
 Best Dialogue

References

External links
 

Bengali-language Bangladeshi films
2015 films
Films based on the Bangladesh Liberation War
Films directed by Morshedul Islam
2010s Bengali-language films
Best Film National Film Award (Bangladesh) winners
Films based on works by Bangladeshi writers